Lycée Gabriel Guist'hau is a senior high school/sixth-form college in Nantes, Loire-Atlantique, France.

It was originally opened in October 1882 as a school for girls. It became coeducational in 1970.

References

External links

 Lycée Gabriel Guist'hau 

Lycées in Nantes
1882 establishments in France
Educational institutions established in 1882